Coleman Scott (born April 19, 1986) is an American wrestler for Sunkist Kids who won the 2012 U.S. Olympic Trials and a special Championship Series at 60 kg freestyle to qualify to compete at the 2012 Olympics. He won the bronze medal at the 2012 Summer Olympics in the men's freestyle 60 kg category. Scott was born in Waynesburg, Pennsylvania.

In 2015, Scott was named head coach of the UNC wrestling program after one year as an assistant.

High school
Coleman attended Waynesburg Central High School in Pennsylvania where he had a record of 156-12 and was a four-time WPIAL champion and three-time PIAA champion.

College
As an Oklahoma State wrestler Coleman was a 2008 NCAA Champion and four-time All-American.

International
Coleman won the 2012 U.S. Olympic Trials, but unlike many of his fellow competitors this did not automatically earn him an Olympic bid. Since the U.S. had not yet qualified in the 60 kg freestyle and since the qualification tournaments were near in time to the trials, two wrestlers were selected to skip the trials and try to qualify the U.S. at that weight. After the U.S. qualified for that weight, a special best-of-three Championship Series at Times Square was arranged allowing the trials winner to compete against the two wrestlers at the qualification tournaments for the Olympic spot. Coleman defeated Reece Humphrey in the semi final. Coleman then defeated Shawn Bunch 2 to 1 the special best-of-three Championship Series final for the 60 kg spot.

At the 2012 Summer Olympics, Scott beat Lee Seung-Chul and Malkhaz Zarkua before losing to eventual champion Toghrul Asgarov. In the repechage, Scott won the bronze medal by beating Kenichi Yumoto.

References 

1986 births
Living people
Olympic bronze medalists for the United States in wrestling
Wrestlers at the 2012 Summer Olympics
Medalists at the 2012 Summer Olympics
Oklahoma State Cowboys wrestlers
American male sport wrestlers